Karena Lam (born 17 August 1978) is a Taiwanese Canadian actress and singer based in Hong Kong. In 2015, she won the Best Actress award at the Golden Horse Awards for her role in Zinnia Flower, making her the first person ever to have won all of the following three Golden Horse awards: Best Lead Actress, Best Supporting Actress and Best New Performer.

Early life 
On 17 August 1978, Lam was born in Vancouver, British Columbia, Canada. Lam's father is from Hong Kong, while her mother is a Japanese–Chinese from Taiwan.

Career 
Lam is a Hong Kong-based actress and winner of three Golden Horse Awards. Lam's first film was Sing Kei Hok Yeuk Kui
(Saturday Appointment), a 1996 Adult Thriller film directed by Sam Ho Shu-Pui.

Lam is also an artist, curator and ambassador of Le French May.
As the curator of Le French May 2017 "Celebration of the Arts", she handpicked a selection of iconic French movies for this cinema programme. Exhibitions she curated include Inoue Yuichi Solo Exhibition ‘Hana’ (at agnes b.’s LIBRAIRIE GALERIE, Hong Kong) and Watanabe Mayumi Solo Exhibition ‘Send in the Clowns’ (Librairie Galerie at K11 Art Mall, Hong Kong).

Personal life
Lam married Yuen Kim Wai, an advertising director, in June 2010. Lam has two daughters, Kaya (b. 2010) and Sofie (b. 2013).

Filmography

Films 
This is a partial list of films.

References

External links
 
 Karena Lam at Chinesemov.com

1978 births
Living people
Canadian actresses of Taiwanese descent
Canadian people of Taiwanese descent
Taiwanese film actresses
Taiwanese expatriates in Hong Kong
Taiwanese television actresses
Actresses from Vancouver
Musicians from Vancouver
21st-century Taiwanese actresses
Taiwanese people of Japanese descent
Taiwanese people of Hong Kong descent
Canadian actresses of Hong Kong descent
Canadian actresses of Japanese descent
21st-century Taiwanese singers
21st-century Taiwanese women singers
Canadian-born Hong Kong artists
Canadian women curators